The major industrial centres in India are listed below:

Andhra Pradesh

Assam

Chhattisgarh

Delhi (UT)

Goa

Gujarat

Haryana

Himachal Pradesh

2 || Nalagarh ||pharmaceutical|-

Jammu and Kashmir (UT)

Jharkhand

Karnataka

Kerala

Madhya Pradesh

Maharashtra

Odisha

Punjab

Rajasthan

Tamil Nadu

Telangana

Uttar Pradesh

Uttarakhand

West Bengal

References

Economy of India lists
Lists of places in India
India
Industry in India
Industrial cities